Thomas Truxtun (or Truxton) (February 17, 1755 – May 5, 1822) was an American naval officer after the Revolutionary War, when he served as a privateer, who rose to the rank of commodore in the late eighteenth century and later served in the Quasi-War with France. He was one of the first six commanders appointed to the new US Navy by President Washington. Later in civilian life he became involved with politics and was also elected as a sheriff.

Early life and education
Truxtun was born near Hempstead, New York, on Long Island, the only son of an English country lawyer.  He lost his father at a young age and was taken to Jamaica on Long Island with relatives and placed under the care of a close friend, John Troup. Having little chance for a formal education, he joined the crew of the British merchant ship Pitt at the age of 12, against his father's previous wishes for him to pursue a career in politics.

Naval service
Because of his skills, by the time he was twenty, Truxtun had garnered command of his own vessel, Andrew Caldwell. Before the Revolution he was impressed into the Royal Navy and was offered a midshipman's warrant, which he turned down.

After being wounded an action against an American privateer, he decided never to fight against his countrymen again. He then operated as a U.S. privateer during the American Revolutionary War, commanding several ships: Congress, Independence, Mars, and St. James. Truxtun was highly successful in capturing enemy ships during this period, not once suffering a defeat.

After the war he returned to the merchant marine, with a high reputation as a seaman. He was the author of a treatise on longitude and latitude, of a "System of masting a 44-gun frigate," and was an advocate for the foundation of a national navy.  He remained in the marine for 12 years. In 1786 he commanded Canton, operating from Philadelphia, one of the first American ships to engage in trade with China. When the United States Navy was reconstituted in 1798 he was one of the original corps of six captains.

Quasi-War
In 1794 and the war with France looming, Truxtun was one of the first six captains appointed by President Washington in the newly formed US Navy. During the Quasi-War with France, Truxtun commanded . For his first assignment he had previously overseen her construction in Baltimore, Maryland, with Silas Talbot. After a rank dispute with captains Dale and Talbot, Truxtun was placed in charge of the ship by President Washington. He commanded her with considerable success.

Constellation engages L'Insurgente

In the early years of the new nation, American commerce suffered much interference from other seafaring nations, and it was during this period that Truxtun gave celebrated service to the navy. First,
because of constant French privateering attacks against American vessels, an American squadron commanded by Truxtun was sent to the West Indies to patrol the waters between Puerto Rico and Saint Kitts with orders to engage any French forces they found in the area. Also on board was the young and later famous John Rodgers, acting 1st Lieutenant. On 9 February 1799, while sailing independently of his squadron in his flagship Constellation, Truxtun encountered and engaged the French frigate LInsurgente, a larger and more heavily armed vessel commanded by Captaine Barreau. After chasing the French ship through a storm, Constellation was able to force LInsurgente into an engagement that lasted an hour and fourteen minutes. Barreau did not strike his colors until his ship was almost a complete wreck. French losses were 29 killed and 44 wounded, while Truxtun's crew only suffered one killed and two wounded. It was the first battle engagement since the Revolutionary War that an American ship had encountered an enemy ship.

Constellation engages La Vengeance

On 31 January 1800, Constellation engaged La Vengeance, a larger vessel with a broadside of  compared to Constellations .{{#tag:ref|The French naval historian Onésime-Joachim Troude reports La Vengeances armament as twenty-six , ten , and four  carronades, a  broadside, compared to Constellations twenty-eight , ten , and one  carronade, a  broadside. |group="note"}} Constellation had sailed under Truxtun from Saint Kitts on 30 January, and encountered La Vengeance the following day. La Vengeance was bound for France under Capitaine de Vaisseau François Pitot carrying passengers and specie, and initially attempted to outrun Constellation. During the battle Constellation was partially dismasted and was forced to make her way to Jamaica. Thirty six hours after the engagement with La Vengeance, while passing the eastern end of Puerto Rico, Enterprise, commanded by Lieutenant Commander Shaw, arrived and fell in with Truxtun. After a short fall in Truxtun sent Enterprise to Philadelphia with important dispatches.

Command of USS President

 was launched on 10 April 1800 and, at the time, was considered America's fastest sailing ship. She was the last of the original six frigates launched. After the vessel was fitted out for sea duty, she set sail for Guadeloupe on 5 August with Captain Truxtun in command, relieving Stephen Decatur. She conducted routine patrols during the latter part of the Quasi-War and recaptured several American merchant ships; however, her overall service in this period was uneventful. She returned to the United States in March after a peace treaty with France was ratified on 3 February 1801.
Truxtun's victories made Truxtun a hero of the time; when he arrived home he was awarded a Congressional Gold Medal on 29 March 1800, becoming the eighth recipient of that body's "highest expression of national appreciation for distinguished achievements and contributions."Seawell, 1898, p. 51.

During this period, Truxtun was involved in a dispute over rank with Richard Dale. Truxtun took command of President for a few months in 1800, then retired from the Navy and located first in Perth Amboy, New Jersey, and later in Philadelphia. He was offered command during the First Barbary War in 1801 but refused, settling firmly into retirement.

Writer
Truxtun had a thorough understanding of the art of celestial navigation and was one among few men of his day who possessed such intimate knowledge of this navigational art. He also designed the original Navy signal manual and wrote the predecessor to the Navy Regulations'' in use today.

Later civilian life
Truxtun ran an unsuccessful campaign for the United States House of Representatives in 1810. In 1816 he was elected sheriff of Philadelphia County, serving until 1819. He also published several books, well known at the time, covering navigation, and naval tactics.

Truxtun died in Philadelphia on 5 May 1822 and is buried at Christ Church Burial Ground. He was the grandfather of American historian Mary Henderson Eastman. as well as naval officer Edward Fitzgerald "Ned" Beale, who became a national figure in 19h century as an explorer, frontiersman, Indian affairs superintendent, California rancher, and close friend of Kit Carson and President Ulysses S. Grant.

Legacy and honors
Six U.S. Navy ships have been named in Truxtun's honor.
The town of Truxton, New York, was named for him.
Truxton Street in Brooklyn, New York.
The village of Truxton, Missouri, was named after Thomas Truxtun.
Washington, D.C. once had a traffic circle, Truxton Circle, named after him.  Even after its demolition, the nearby neighborhood has retained his name.
Truxtun, in Portsmouth, Virginia, one of the first federally funded planned communities in America, was named for him. It was built shortly after World War I for African-American workers at Norfolk Naval Shipyard.
Truxtun Arcade at the United States Merchant Marine Academy is named in honor of the American Merchant Mariner turned Naval Hero Thomas Truxtun.

See also
List of sea captains
List of ships captured in the 19th century
Bibliography of early American naval history
Truxton Bowl

Notes

References

Bibliography

Further reading

 Dated, but still the best biography of Truxtun in print.

External links

Excerpt from Truxtun's signal book 
Eugene S. Ferguson, Truxtun of the Constellation (322pp, 1956)

1755 births
1822 deaths
18th-century American naval officers
19th-century American naval officers
United States Navy commodores
American people of English descent
American military personnel of the Quasi-War
People from Hempstead (village), New York
Congressional Gold Medal recipients
United States Navy personnel of the American Revolution
Sheriffs of Philadelphia
People of the Province of New York
Burials at Christ Church, Philadelphia